The men's freestyle light heavyweight was a freestyle wrestling event held as part of the Wrestling at the 1928 Summer Olympics programme. It was the third appearance of the event. Light heavyweight was the second-heaviest category, including wrestlers weighing up to 87 kilograms.

Results
Source: Official results; Wudarski

Gold medal round

Silver medal round

Bronze medal round

References

Wrestling at the 1928 Summer Olympics